Parliamentary elections were held in Gabon on 17 December 2011. Amidst an opposition boycott, the ruling Gabonese Democratic Party (PDG) won a landslide victory; official results were announced on 21 December 2011, showing that the PDG won 113 out of 120 seats, the most it had won since the beginning of multiparty politics in the early 1990s. A few other parties won the handful of seats remaining: the Rally for Gabon (RPG) won three seats, while the Circle of Liberal Reformers (CLR), the Independent Centre Party (PGCI), Social Democratic Party (PSD), and the Union for the New Republic (UPRN) won a single seat each.

Turnout was 34%, with many opposition supporters choosing to boycott.

Results
Alongside the PDG, the Rally for Gabon, Circle of Liberal Reformers, Independent Centre Party, Democratic and Republican Alliance, Morena–Original, Rally for Democracy and Progress were all part of the Republican Majority for Emergence coalition.

References

Elections in Gabon
Gabon
Legislative election
Election and referendum articles with incomplete results
December 2011 events in Africa